Bradish is a surname. Notable people with the surname include:

Alvah Bradish (1806–1901), American portrait painter and professor
Joseph Bradish (1672–1700), English pirate
Kyle Bradish (born 1996), American baseball player
Luther Bradish (1783–1863), American lawyer and politician
Sarah Powers Bradish (1867–1922), American writer and temperance activist